Janaína Dutra (November 30, 1960 – February 8, 2004) was an LGBTQIA+ activist and a lawyer from Brazil. She is recognized for being the first transfeminine person to carry a professional card from the Brazilian Bar Association.

In 2021 she was honoured with a Google Doodle by Google.

References

1960 births
2004 deaths
20th-century Brazilian lawyers
LGBT lawyers